Giudecca is an island in the Venetian Lagoon, in northern Italy. It is part of the sestiere of Dorsoduro and is a locality of the comune of Venice.

Geography
Giudecca lies immediately south of the central islands of Venice, from which it is separated by the Giudecca Canal. San Giorgio Maggiore lies off its eastern tip.

History
Giudecca was known in ancient times as the Spinalunga (meaning "Long Thorn"). The name Giudecca may represent a corruption of the Latin "Judaica" ("Judaean") and so may be translated as "the Jewry": a number of towns in Southern Italy and Sicily have Jewish quarters named Giudecca or Judeca. However, the original Venetian Ghetto was in Cannaregio, in the north of the city, and there is no evidence, but for the name, of Jews ever having lived in Giudecca. Furthermore, the term "Giudecca" was not used to denote the Jewish quarters of towns in northern Italy.

Giudecca was historically an area of large palaces with gardens, the island became an industrial area in the early 20th century with shipyards and factories, and a film studio.  Much of the industry went into decline after World War II, but it is now once more regarded as a quiet residential area of largely working-class housing with some chic apartments and exclusive houses.  It is known for its long dock and its churches, including the Palladio-designed Il Redentore. The island was the home of a huge flour mill, the Molino Stucky, which has been converted into a luxury hotel and apartment complex. At the other end of Giudecca is the famous five-star Cipriani hotel with large private gardens and salt-water pool.

Resort town
Modern renovations of some antique architecture in Giudecca have bolstered the island's reputation as a vacation locale. In 2011, Venetian developers reopened the lodgings of a prominent 16th-century mansion as long-term rentals under the name "Villa F."

Gallery

See also
 List of islands of Italy

References

External links 

 Satellite image from Google Maps
 Guide, news, events in Giudecca
 Mini Guide to Giudecca

Islands of the Venetian Lagoon
Dorsoduro
Geography of Venice
Historic Jewish communities